The 2016 Curitiba Challenger was a professional tennis tournament played on clay courts. It was the first edition of the tournament which was part of the 2016 ATP Challenger Tour. It took place in Curitiba, Brazil between 29 August – 4 September 2016.

Singles main-draw entrants

Seeds

 1 Rankings are as of August 22, 2016.

Other entrants
The following players received wildcards into the singles main draw:
  Igor Marcondes
  Rafael Camilo
  Fernando Yamacita
  Eduardo Russi Assumpção

The following players received entry as an alternate into the singles main draw:
  André Ghem
  Gonzalo Lama

The following players received entry from the qualifying draw:
  Gianni Mina
  Caio Silva
  Fabrício Neis
  Oscar José Gutierrez

Champions

Singles

  Agustín Velotti def.  André Ghem, 6–0, 6–4.

Doubles

  Rubén Ramírez Hidalgo /  Pere Riba def.  André Ghem /  Fabrício Neis, 6–73–7, 6–4, [10–7].

External links 
Official website

Curitiba Challenger